The Collegiate Sports Video Association (CSVA) is an association of  video coordinators involved in college football, college basketball, high school football, the NFL, AFL, and CFL. However, membership is strongly focused on collegiate video coordinators, mostly in football.

The CSVA was founded in a meeting by four video coordinators in South Bend, Indiana in 1994. the first conference took place on July 17, 1995, also in South Bend.

Goals
The CSVA's main goals are to serve the members and provide a place for dialogue and development within the profession. Among the key principals of the CSVA, they strive to:

1. Evaluate professional standards among all Video Coordinators

2. Facilitate the exchange of information and technological innovations

3. Advance ethical procedures and quality techniques

4. Raise the awareness of the role that Video Coordinators play within the athletic environment

Charter Members
 Chad Bunn (BYU) President 
 Ken Norris (UCLA) Vice President 
 Mike Arias (Texas) Treasurer 
 Stu Reynolds (Oregon) Secretary 
 Chuck Linster (Notre Dame) Executive Advisor 
 Mark Smith (CAL) PAC-10 Representative 
 Chris Schleter (North Carolina) ACC Representative 
 Jeff Naple (Pittsburgh) Big East Representative 
 Fred Vint (Oklahoma) Big Eight Representative 
 Brian Bray (Houston) Southwest Representative 
 Harry Kubasek (Army) Independents Representative 
 Scott Eilert (Kansas State) 
 Dusty Alves (Colorado) 
 Brian Powell (Kansas) 
 Tim Collins (Notre Dame) 
 Mike Magruder (Baylor) 
 Mike Martin (Oklahoma) 
 David Kaplan (Army)

Annual Awards

Bob Matey National Video Coordinator of the Year Award 
The Bob Matey Award is presented to the individual who possesses the qualities and attributes that exudes the characteristics that are portrayed from the late Bob Matey, video coordinator from Texas A&M.

A pioneer in the coaches’ video field, Bob Matey was instrumental in the development and operation of Texas A&M's video laboratory from 1987 until his death in 1997.

Prior to the formation of the Collegiate Sports Video Association in 1995, Matey was an instrumental voice in getting the organization formed.  Bob was one of the founding members that led the charge stating we (video coordinators) need to form an organization to bring value and respect to our jobs.

Matey oversaw the technical transition from film acquisition to videotape acquisition of football practices and games as Texas A&M was one of the first colleges in the country to convert to the BetaCam format in 1987.  The use of videotape revolutionized the play-by-play breakdown of games and practices and has become an industry standard for football players and coaches in game preparation and evaluation.  Bob was also at the forefront of the transition to non-linear editing tools for coaching breakdown at Texas A&M.

Matey's background as a player and coach were valuable commodities for the Texas A&M video laboratory as the Aggie football team won six conference championship and made nine bowl trips.  In addition to his coach's video work, Matey also produced both the football and basketball head coaches shows.

Matey came to Texas A&M in 1984 and served as a volunteer, part-time and graduate assistant football coach, working primarily with the defensive line, before becoming the head of the video laboratory in 1987.  Before coming to Texas A&M, Matey served as defensive line coach at Pittsburgh from 1973 to 1982, first under Johnny Majors and later under Jackie Sherrill.  The Panthers won the national championship in 1976.

He began his coaching career as a graduate assistant at his alma mater, Iowa State, in 1972.  He lettered three years as a nose guard for the Cyclones, earning All-Big Eight honors in 1971.  He earned a degree in physical education from ISU in 1972.

Bob Matey National Video Coordinator of the Year Recipients

Conference Video Coordinator of the Year Awards

American Conference  (Formerly Big East Conference)

Atlantic Coast Conference

Big 12 Conference

Big Ten Conference

*The Big Ten Conference chose to honor Shawn Coin of Youngstown State by naming him Big Ten Video Coordinator of the Year.  Shawn died unexpectedly after football practice on Monday, August 18, 2008.

Conference USA

FBS Independent

Mid-American Conference

Mountain West Conference

Pac-12 Conference  (Formerly Pac-10 Conference)

Southeastern Conference

Sun Belt Conference

Football Championship Subdivision (FCS) 

Western Athletic Conference  (Discontinued after folding of Western Athletic Conference following 2012 Football Season)

Division II  (Discontinued Following 2012 Season)

Division III  (Discontinued Following 2017 Season)

High School  (Discontinued Following 2018 Season)

Basketball  (Discontinued after folding of Western Athletic Conference following 2012 Football Season)

SAVVY Awards

Ultimate SAVVY

Highlight SAVVY

Motivational SAVVY

Recruiting SAVVY

Short Social SAVVY

Basketball SAVVY  (Discontinued)

Sports Film and Video Hall of Fame 
The CSVA Sports Film and Video Hall of Fame was designed to honor the achievements of sports video personnel who have dedicated their lives to the video profession.  Through their innovation, desire and commitment to enhance the profession they have paved the way for the future of the industry.  This award represents the accomplishments they have brought to the business.

Hall of Fame Inductees

Conference Scholarships

Billy Vizzini CSVA Conference Scholarship 
The Billy Vizzini Scholarship was established in May 2008 as a tribute to Florida State University's former Director of Video Services, William “Billy” Vizzini III.  A 1993 graduate of Florida State University, Vizzini was a member of the coaches' video staff since 1994 and headed the department since 1997.  With his research and knowledge, Vizzini brought Florida State athletics to the cutting edge in terms of providing the Seminoles with the most advanced and sophisticated systems in the country.

Vizzini oversaw a staff that videos all practices and games for many of Florida State's sports.  Billy worked primarily with Florida State's nationally renowned football program and oversaw all of FSU's varsity sports programs.  From 1994 to 1997, he served as the video coordinator for the basketball programs and the Olympic sports.

Named Vice President of the Collegiate Sports Video Association in 2003, Billy enthusiastically took on the role as chairman of the Convention Committee.  He was instrumental in the growth and development of the CSVA Annual Conference, increasing member and sponsor involvement threefold in less than four years.  He was the CSVA representative to the Sports Video Group (SVG), a sports technology group that spans sports broadcasting networks, sports and broadcast technology manufacturers and developers, and sports teams and franchises.  Billy was a charter member of the SVG Board of Directors.

A New Orleans, Louisiana native, Vizzini earned a master's degree in Athletic Administration in 1995 and his undergrad in Meteorology, both from FSU.  He was an active member of the American Football Coaches Association (AFCA) and the Tallahassee Quarterback Club.  Vizzini also served as the assistant camp director for Team Camp USA which is held during summers in

Tallahassee.

Unfortunately, Billy passed away in 2007 at the age of 36, following a battle with cancer.  We will all truly miss Billy's hard work and dedication to the Sports Video profession as well as his friendship.

Scholarship Recipients

Mike Dougherty NFL Scholarship 
The Mike Dougherty NFL Scholarship was established in May 2015 as a tribute to Mike “Doc” Dougherty, long time video director for the Philadelphia Eagles.  Doc began his career under Dick Vermeil and continued through Andy Reid, serving the Eagles’ franchise for 37 years until his retirement following the completion of the 2012 season.

During his time with the Eagles, Doc was part of many playoff games, a pair of Super Bowls, and the Pro Bowl, totaling a whopping 776 games.  He never missed a game during his career.  He was a mainstay for the franchise while working under three different owners, seven head coaches, and over 100 assistant coaches.

After leaving the Navy in 1974, he worked part-time for a local film company that helped the Eagles with practice and game footage.  In 1976 Dick Vermeil wanted a full-time video director and hired Dougherty at a salary of $185 per week.  As the Eagles’ first full-time video director, Doc and Vermeil built the video department to a level that was respected throughout the league.  A humble beginning for a man that the Eagles sent to the NFL Draft each year beginning in 1980 to deliver their picks.

Doc served on the NFL Video Directors Committee for 18 years, during which he was part of the evolution of technology in football.  What began on 16-millimeter film with coaches and players all having to watch together progressed to every player and coach being able to access film remotely via their phones, tablets, and computers.

A Philadelphia native, Doc and his Wife, Marge, reside in Ridley Park, Pennsylvania.  His loyalty and generosity to the video profession paired with a gift from the NFL are what make this scholarship a possibility.

Scholarship Recipients

CSVA Diversity and Inclusion Scholarship 
The CSVA Diversity and Inclusion Scholarship was established in July 2020 in an effort to educate and diversify the sports video profession.  The scholarship helps a minority member of our association attend the conference that would otherwise not be able to attend.

“We, the Collegiate Sports Video Association (CSVA), will be taking a strong stance of inclusion and equality within our association.  We will strive to welcome and celebrate individuals from ALL walks of life.  We will continue to provide educational opportunities for growth both personally and professionally, designed to help all members grow and manage their careers.  We will strive to be more representative of the programs we support.”

The scholarship is a commitment from CSVA to be an inclusive association that welcomes and embraces diversity.  Furthermore, it will provide educational, professional development and networking opportunities for minority members for years to come.

Thank you to the members of our Diversity and Inclusion Committee for their help and support in making this scholarship a reality.

Scholarship Recipients

References

External links
 Official site

American football organizations
College football mass media
College sports organizations in the United States
Sports organizations established in 1994
National Football League culture
1994 establishments in the United States